Etelka Freund (1879 – 27 May 1977) was a Hungarian pianist.

A disciple of Ferruccio Busoni, she played regularly for Johannes Brahms during her training years. An international career, throughout which she was an early exponent of Béla Bartók's music, followed her 1901 debut. She brought it to a halt in 1910, resuming it in the mid-1930s. She made her American debut in 1947, at the National Gallery of Art.

References
  Arbiter Records
  Bach Cantatas Website

External links
Etelka Freund - Profile at The Remington Site
, WNCN-FM, 7-Jan-1983

1879 births
1977 deaths
Hungarian classical pianists
Hungarian women pianists
Women classical pianists